The following is a list of kidnappings summarizing the events of each individual case, including instances of celebrity abductions, claimed hoaxes, suspected kidnappings, extradition abductions, and mass kidnappings.

Before 1900

1900–1949

1950–1979

1980–1989

1990–1999

2000–2009

2010–2019

2020s and later

Modern kidnappings of celebrities or their relatives

Kidnappers interested in getting a large ransom or a political effect often target celebrities or their relatives. Here are some of the people affected by these crimes:

Leon Ames: Film and television actor who, together with his wife, was held hostage at their home on 12 February 1964. They were rescued by police, who had been alerted to the case by his business partner.
Leonard Firestone (57–58), American businessman, philanthropist, diplomat was the target of an aborted kidnapped plan that was to take place in 1966.
Cindy Birdsong: A member of the Motown supergroup The Supremes. Birdsong was kidnapped in December 1969, aged 30, at knife-point from her Hollywood apartment and escaped two hours later by jumping from the car at a freeway exit. Charles Collier, the handyman at Birdsong's apartment, was later convicted of the kidnapping.
Karl von Spreti: West-Germany's ambassador to Guatemala, was kidnapped in 1970 in Guatemala City and later murdered.
Jorge and Juan Born (1974), scions of the Bunge y Born business, were kidnapped in September by the Montoneros and only released after the payment of a $60 million ransom.
Jorge Campos (soccer player): In 1999, his father was kidnapped and later found alive in Acapulco, Mexico.
Rajkumar (born Singanalluru Puttaswamayya Muthuraju) an actor and singer in Kannada film industry, was kidnapped from the actor's house at Gajanur in Tamil Nadu on 30 July 2000, along with his son-in-law Govindaraju and two others. He was released unharmed on 15 November 2000, after 108 days of captivity.
Françoise Claustre: French archaeologist who was kidnapped in Chad by guerillas led by Hissène Habré. Her husband, Pierre, was the head of the French foreign aid mission in Chad and he was also taken hostage when he tried to secure her release.
Chris Cramer: British news journalist and executive for BBC who was one of the 25 hostages held during the Iranian Embassy siege. Cramer was released on 1 May 1980, after falsely complaining that he felt ill, and later provided information on the situation.
Baron Édouard-Jean Empain: Industrialist who was kidnapped for ransom. His captors cut off one of his fingers in order to bring proof that they held him. He was later released.
John Paul Getty III, kidnapped in Italy in 1973. His grandfather, the then world's richest man, American multi-billionaire oil tycoon, J. Paul Getty, refused to pay his $3 million ransom until one of the boy's ears was cut off and sent to a newspaper.
Georgiy Gongadze: Prominent Ukrainian journalist kidnapped and later found beheaded in 2000. His disappearance has triggered a major political and diplomatic scandal also involving United States and other Western countries. No details of the crime have been revealed yet.
Freddy Heineken (1983): Chairman of the board of directors and CEO of the brewing company Heineken International and his driver Ab Doderer, were kidnapped between 9 and 30 November 1983 in Amsterdam.
Jennifer Hudson: Her nephew was kidnapped after her mother and brother were shot to death. He was later found dead.
Julio Iglesias: His father was kidnapped in 1985, but was found alive and healthy.
Charles Lindbergh: The aviator's two-year-old son, Charles Jr., was kidnapped in 1932 and was killed. Bruno Hauptmann was arrested and executed for the crime, but concerns remain regarding Hauptmann's guilt and the fairness of the trial (see Lindbergh kidnapping).
Madonna: American singer-songwriter and actress who was supposedly tied to a chair and held captive by ex-husband Sean Penn at their house in Malibu, California home on 28 December 1989. She has categorically denied that this incident has occurred, and the couple later separated.
Adi Koila Mara Nailatikau: First daughter of Fiji and senator, was kidnapped during a coup against her father. Kidnappers threatened to kill her, but she survived.
Yoko Ono: Her second husband Anthony Cox abducted their daughter Kyoko Chan Cox in 1971. Ono and her daughter were finally reunited in 1997.
Jessica Alba: Actress and businesswoman who was kidnapped and held captive for 14 hours in 1996. She was later discovered bound, blindfolded and gagged, but her kidnapper was never brought to trial and the case was dropped.
Benedict Cumberbatch and two acquaintances were kidnapped by six armed men in South Africa in 2005 while filming the miniseries To the End of the Earth. The trio were released unharmed shortly thereafter.
Veruska Ramirez, former Miss Venezuela, kidnapped in 2003 and released three hours later after signing fifteen autographs for her captors.
David Letterman: In 2005, FBI agents and Montana authorities foiled a kidnapping of Letterman's son from his Choteau, Montana home.
Riddick Bowe (boxer): Former world heavyweight champion kidnapped his estranged wife, Judy, and their five children from North Carolina in February 1998, hoping to reconcile his marriage. Police captured Bowe in South Hill, Virginia, freeing his family.
Cesar Rosas: Member of Los Lobos whose wife, Sandra, was kidnapped on 23 October 1999 and later found dead. Gabriel Gómez was accused and sentenced for her kidnapping and murder.
Daryush Shokof: The artist-filmmaker was kidnapped after he screened his films Iran Zendan and Hitler's Grave that portrayed the horrible situations of Iranian Political Prisoners in Iran and under the Islamic republic Regime of Iran in Berlin, Germany. He said he was held by Arabic speaking men for 12 days and was released after agreeing not to publicize the films. He was later thrown into the Rhine river in Cologne, Germany. The German Police debates the validity of the incident up to this date.
Frank Sinatra Jr. (1963), son of Frank Sinatra, was kidnapped by Barry Keenan and Joe Amsler and released after a ransom of $240,000 was paid a few days later. Most of the ransom money was recovered.
Johnny Tapia: The world boxing champion saw his mother raped and kidnapped when he was 8 years old. He was hiding when he witnessed the assault. His mother's body was found on a road days later.
Thalía: The Mexican diva's sisters, Ernestina Sodi and actress Laura Zapata, were kidnapped, but later both released alive.
Nikoloz Tskitishvili: The basketball player, a star in his home country (Georgia), had strangers call his house and threaten to kidnap his brother and mother after it became known he signed a million-dollar contract with the NBA's Denver Nuggets. As a consequence, he moved all his family to Denver.
Rubén Omar Romano, Argentine soccer coach, was kidnapped in Mexico on 19 July 2005 and rescued two months later.
Thiago da Silva (25), Brazilian footballer who was kidnapped in Rio de Janeiro on 24 September 2008 and while trying to escape was shot multiple times which caused him to die six day later.
Alex Band: Singer-songwriter best known as the guitarist for The Calling, Band was reportedly robbed, beaten and then abandoned near some train tracks by two unidentified assailants on 18 August 2013. He was rushed to a nearby hospital, where he was treated and later released.
Duffy (25), whose real name is "Aimee Anne Duffy" had claimed that in 2010 that she had been kidnapped, raped, and drugged, and managed to escape. She has not revealed the kidnappers' identities or where this took place.
Victor Li Tzar-kuoi, son of the Hong Kong tycoon, Li Ka Shing: Kidnapped by Cheung Chi Keung, AKA "Big Spender". He was released after the world record payment of a HK$1,000,000,000 (US$134,000,000) ransom. Cheung was later captured and executed in Guangzhou in 2000.
Daisy McCrackin (37), was kidnapped on 3 May 2017 while in Los Angeles and held hostage in her own car while be driven around. McCrackin later escaped and her kidnappers are now facing charges.
Einár: Swedish rapper who was kidnapped by gang members associated with rival rapper Yasin in April 2020. He was later released, but was killed the following year when he was scheduled to testify in the case.

Faked kidnappings
Jules Croiset, Dutch actor who faked being kidnapped by neo-Nazis in 1987 in order to stir enough outrage to prevent a play he considered to be antisemitic from being performed.
Dar Heatherington, Alberta city councillor who claimed to have been abducted in Montana.
Jennifer Wilbanks: American woman who alleged that she was kidnapped as an excuse for her running away from her own wedding in late April 2005, in the Runaway bride case.
Somália, Brazilian footballer who falsely claimed in 2011 that he had been kidnapped. It was proved that he was running late for a training session and tried to avoid a 40% wage cut for tardiness.
Sherri Papini, California woman whose 2016 disappearance became a national news story, later arrested and accused of faking her abduction.

Suspected kidnappings
 Helen Brach, millionaire owner of a candy company; an informant claimed she was kidnapped after leaving the Mayo Clinic, then murdered; her remains have never been located.
 Hassani Campbell, 5-year-old boy with cerebral palsy, went missing in Oakland, California on 10 August 2009. Hassani's foster father, Louis Ross, said he left Hassani waiting at the back of the shoe store where Hassani's aunt, Jennifer Campbell, worked while he went around to the front of the store with Hassani's younger sister.
Haleigh Cummings, the child, according to news reports from CNN and other major television news sources, was being watched by the girlfriend, later wife, of her father, Ronald Cummings, when she disappeared from her mobile home in Satsuma, Florida in February 2009. Two persons of interest in the still unsolved kidnapping were implicated in a drug sting in January 2010, renewing interest in the case.
Jimmy Hoffa, disappeared and declared legally dead. Several rumors and theories, including an alleged kidnapping, surfaced in later years.
Aimee Semple McPherson, evangelist who maintained she was kidnapped and held for ransom from 18 May through 23 June 1926 until she escaped. A grand jury inquiry instead charged her with fabricating it. Charges against McPherson were dropped for lack of evidence. No indictments against her described kidnappers were pursued.
Cédrika Provencher, 10-year-old girl from Trois-Rivières, Canada went missing on 31 July 2007. Her remains were discovered on 11 December 2015.
Dru Sjodin, American college student, seems to have been abducted on 22 November 2003, and was found dead on 17 April 2004.

Kidnapping in lieu of extradition
See main article: Extradition and abduction
Humberto Álvarez Machaín, from Mexico to the United States by locals hired by the U.S. Drug Enforcement Administration in 1990.
Jabez Balfour, from Argentina to the United Kingdom in 1895.
Ronnie Biggs, from Brazil to the United Kingdom by independent bounty hunters in 1981.
Adolf Eichmann, from Argentina to Israel in 1960.
Mir Aimal Kansi, from Pakistan to the United States in 1997.
Andrew Luster, from Mexico to the United States by Duane Chapman ("Dog the Bounty Hunter") in 2003.
Martin Mubanga, from Zambia to Guantanamo Bay by the United States in 2002.
Hassan Mustafa Osama Nasr, from Italy to Egypt by the CIA in 2005.
Morton Sobell, from Mexico to the United States in 1950.
Mordechai Vanunu, from Italy to Israel in 1986.

Mass kidnappings
1976 Chowchilla kidnapping: 26 children on a school bus and the bus driver were held in a buried moving van, in a quarry.
2010 Kurram agency mass kidnapping: 60 people were taken from the Kurram Tribunial Agency in Pakistan by militants dressed as police officers.
2014 Chibok kidnapping: More than 200 schoolgirls were taken from their school during an exam. The Boko Haram terrorist group is suspected to have perpetrated the attack.
2014 Iguala mass kidnapping: 43 male students from a rural school in Mexico were planning to go to a protest in Mexico City when they were shot at by police and taken into custody.
2015 Malari kidnapping: 40 boys and young men were kidnapped by Boko Haram.
2018 Dapchi kidnapping: 110 schoolchildren from their school were kidnapped by Boko Haram.
2020 Kankara kidnapping: 334 schoolchildren from their school were kidnapped by Boko Haram.
2021 Kagara kidnapping: 27 schoolchildren from their school were kidnapped and one killed, three members of the school's staff and 12 of their relatives were also abducted.
2021 Jangebe kidnapping: 279 schoolchildren from their school were kidnapped by armed bandits in Jangebe.
2021 Afaka kidnapping: 39 students (23 females and 16 males) were kidnapped by armed bandits in Afaka.

See also
List of child abuse cases featuring long-term detention

References

 
Kidnappings